Virginia gained one seat after the 1810 Census, bringing its representation in the House of Representatives to 23 seats, the largest number Virginia would ever have.  Virginia went from having the most representatives to having the second-most tied with Pennsylvania. New York, with its 27 seats, surpassed Virginia and remained the most populous state until the late 1960s.

Its elections were held in April 1813, after the term began but before Congress's first meeting.

See also 
 United States House of Representatives elections, 1812 and 1813
 List of United States representatives from Virginia

Notes 

1813
Virginia
United States House of Representatives